Achandunie is a village north of Alness in  Ross-shire in the Scottish council area of the Highland. The village lies on the B9176 road to the north of Alness.

References

Populated places in Ross and Cromarty